Campichthys is a genus of pipefishes native to the Indian and Pacific Oceans.

Species
There are currently four recognized species in this genus:
 Campichthys galei (Duncker, 1909) (Gale's pipefish)
 Campichthys nanus C. E. Dawson, 1977
 Campichthys tricarinatus C. E. Dawson, 1977 (Three-keel pipefish)
 Campichthys tryoni (J. D. Ogilby, 1890) (Tryon's pipefish)

References

 
Marine fish genera
Taxa named by Gilbert Percy Whitley